Gadūnavas (Samogitian: Gadūnavs) is a town in Telšiai County, Lithuania. According to the 2011 census, the town has a population of 98 people.

References

Towns in Lithuania
Towns in Telšiai County
Telšiai District Municipality